The National Premier Chess Championship is the annual national chess championship of India. It was established in 1955 by the Andhra State Chess Association as a biannual event, but since 1971 it has been played yearly. The first edition was held in Eluru, Andhra Pradesh from May 15 to May 28 and was jointly won by Ramchandra Sapre and D. Venkayya with 9/12 points. Earlier, G. S. Dikshit of Pithapuram won the Andhra and Madras State Championships for three consecutive years, 1952–54.

The women's championship commenced in 1974. The first ten editions were dominated by the Khadilkar sisters Vasanti, Jayshree and Rohini. Rohini is the youngest and won the championship five times, Jayshree won four titles, and the eldest, Vasanti, won the championship in the inaugural year.

Winners

Notes

References
 List of winners 1955-2006
 List of women's winners 1974-2006
 D.K. Bharadwaj (2003), A big boom in the brain game; A history of chess in India
 The Hindu news 41st edition
 The Hindu news 
 Chessbase report of the 43rd edition
 Chessbase report of the 44th edition
 TWIC news 34th Women's edition
 The Hindu Dated June 6, 1952  (Article Chess Notes   G. S. Dikshit, State Champion by T. A. Krishnamachariar)
 The Hindu  Dated  June 6, 1952   Picture of Mr. G. S. Dikshit Madras State Chess Championship
 The Hindu Dated June 29, 1952  The Madras State Tournament by T. A. Krishnamachariar
 The Hindu Dated July 27, 1952 Chess Notes  Facts and Figures  By T. A Krishnamachariar
 The Hindu Dated July 1953 ... Three In a Row for South Indian Star  by V. K. Raman Menon   (date unknown.. month and year known)
 The Hindu Dated January 9, 1956  Chess. Andhra State Tourney Dixit Wins Title Again (from our correspondent) Kakinada
 The Hindu January 29, 1956 Chess Notes  The Andhra State Championship By T. A Krishnamachariar

Chess national championships
Women's chess national championships
Championship
1955 in chess
1974 in chess
Recurring sporting events established in 1955
1955 establishments in India